Perbrinckia is a genus of freshwater crabs of the family Gecarcinucidae that is endemic to Sri Lanka, named after Per Brinck. Its natural habitats are subtropical or tropical moist lowland forests, subtropical or tropical swamps, and rivers. It contains 14 species, most of which are included on the IUCN Red List as critically endangered species (CR) or vulnerable species (VU) because they are threatened by habitat loss; only one species is of least concern (LC).

Species
Perbrinckia cracens Ng, 1995 
Perbrinckia enodis (Kinglsey, 1880) 
Perbrinckia fenestra Bahir & Ng, 2005 
Perbrinckia fido Ng, 1995 
Perbrinckia gabadagei Bahir & Ng, 2005 
Perbrinckia glabra Ng, 1995 
Perbrinckia integra Ng, 1995 
Perbrinckia morayensis Ng & Tay, 2001 
Perbrinckia punctata Ng, 1995 
Perbrinckia quadratus Ng & Tay, 2001 
Perbrinckia rosae Bahir & Ng, 2005 
Perbrinckia scansor (Ng, 1995) 
Perbrinckia scitula Ng, 1995 
Perbrinckia uva Bahir, 1998

References

Gecarcinucidae
Freshwater crustaceans of Asia
Crustaceans of Sri Lanka
Taxonomy articles created by Polbot